Technical Integrity Engineering is a term applied to the engineering disciplines associated with the design, assurance, and verification functions that ensure a product, process, or system meets its appropriate and intended requirements under stated operating conditions. Application of these disciplines minimizes the cost, schedule, technical, and legal risks of a program and improves the overall life cycle cost.

Asset Integrity is a term that relates to the process that improves operational reliability, safety, and asset protection whilst at the same time helping to maximize plant performance and mitigate the constant challenges and hazards facing heavy industries such as Oil and Gas, Power Generation and Nuclear.
 
It is also considered the discipline and profession of acquiring and applying scientific, mathematical, economic, social, legal, and practical knowledge to the assurance, and verification functions that ensure a product, process, or system meets (and is meeting) its appropriate and intended safety, legal, and business requirement(s).

Typical responsibilities for an Integrity Engineer include coordinating the efficient and cost-effective implementation of inspections and integrity management programs and ensuring the integrity of plant facilities including all onshore and offshore structures, pipelines, stationary equipment, piping systems, etc.

In the scope of Integrity Management, it is essential that this role is independent so that unbiased and forthright decisions are made to ensure that equipment is designed, maintained, operated, and decommissioned in a responsible manner that complies with the industry’s best practices.

Scope

Integrity Engineers may be required to manage, develop, or conduct the following: 

 A high-level integrity management philosophy which includes verification and assurance of facilities (Basic repair methods and strategies, Static equipment repair and temporary repairs, Fabric maintenance, Corrosion Engineering, Inspection Engineering, Chemical management, and Maintenance Management)
 A Competency Management scheme
 An RBI analysis
 Integrity processes. i.e. Write Risk-Based Inspection methodologies, Temporary Repair methodologies, Maintenance Strategies, Mechanical Integrity Management Strategy (MIMS), Structural Integrity Management Strategy (SIMS), Pipeline Integrity Management Strategy (PIMS), Well Integrity Management System (WIMS), and create corrosion circuits for the plant process
 Verification Schemes and performance Standards management
 Conduct Life extension studies
 A Fitness-for-service review
 Write and review Integrity Management Plans
 Identify, investigate and assess deterioration/corrosion and ensure timely maintenance of the affected facilities.
 Implement Inspection and Corrosion Control Policy and Risk Based Inspection (RBI) methods to manage integrity, and optimize inspections frequency, maintenance cost, and plant availability
 Lead and conduct RBI reviews
 Participate in the preparation of Capital and Operating budgets for Inspection
 Monitor and oversee the execution of inspection programs and activities
 Liaise closely with Operations, Technical Services, Corrosion engineering, Inspection Engineering, Verification Engineering, Process/Chemical and Mechanical Engineering and other Maintenance Units to coordinate major shutdowns and turn-around activities
 Supervise, witness, and participate in the certification process of hydro tests and load tests of lifting devices and cylinders
 Ensure systematic and consistent implementation of work methods and procedures used in Maintenance and Inspection and recommend improvements
 Ensure systematic update of maintenance management systems
 Participate in technical studies, Process and Instrument diagram reviews, Safety Integrity Level (SIL) assessments and HAZOPs
 Lead in failure investigations
Input and control of asset integrity management software
 
Integrity Engineering encompasses the concept of:
 Organize, review, analyze, improve and control cycle  
 Consistency of actions, values, methods, measures, principles, expectations, and outcomes
 An undivided or unbroken completeness or totality with nothing wanting
 Knowledge of many interfaces of technology
 Balancing and countering the materials degradation process during the in-service life cycle of equipment
Ensuring the recommended risk mitigation actions derived from the RBI study are implemented
Ensuring inspection intervals are not exceeded
Ensuring resources are available for RBI Assessments

This may be applied to management, machines, devices, systems, materials, and processes that safely realize improvements to the lives of assets.

The Integrity Engineer (IE) may also be involved with other asset life-cycle issues such as the basis of design (Process design basis) through to recycling. The Front End Engineering Design stage (FEED) aids in the selection of vessels, piping, pipelines, and other equipment. At this FEED stage, the optimum material requirements, mitigation, and maintenance requirements for the intended period of operation become the basis for detailed engineering. It is the role of the IE to develop/validate the integrity management plan and implement the monitoring and management procedure for the intended period of operation. It may also be the responsibility of the integrity engineer to incorporate and manage any variation identified (metal loss, material degradation, cracking mechanisms, mitigation issues i.e. Cathodic protection potentials, coating failures, etc.) during the monitoring regime.

It may be a generalist in nature and/or applied with specific prior knowledge denoted using a pre-nominal of Mechanical, Inspection, Asset, Well or Wellhead, Technical, Pipeline, Signal, Fabrication, or Commissioning depending upon the equipment or system under scrutiny.

Integrity Engineers construct and implement Integrity Management plans that detail the requirements of the item or asset under scrutiny and study any adverse effects from internal and or external sources that damage / impair that item or system. These are used to build suitable inspection and condition monitoring forward strategies. The monitoring may include both physical (pipes/vessels) and nonphysical systems (Management legal obligations). This diversity will depend upon the requirements of the task at hand.

Integrity Engineers also oversee or carry out Integrity Engineering Audit(s) to ensure legal compliance with company, national and international standards and ensure that there is a level of quality assurance within the process that meets good engineering standards.

See also
 Corrosion engineering

External links 
 Oil and Gas Fundamentals The Fundamentals of Asset Integrity
 Asset Integrity Engineering training Integrity Engineering training
 NACE Training Course - Pipeline Corrosion Integrity Management Pipeline Corrosion Integrity

References

 Integrity Of Engineering Components Journal Sadhana Publisher Springer India, in co-publication with Indian Academy of Sciences ISSN 0256-2499 (Print) 0973-7677 (Online) Issue Volume 20, Number 1 / February 1995
 NASA and Engineering Integrity Michael D. Griffin Administrator National Aeronautics and Space Administration Wernher von Braun Memorial Symposium American Astronautical Society 21 October 2008
 Implementation of Asset Integrity Management System Muhammad Abduh PetroEnergy Magazine April – May 2008 Edition http://abduh137.wordpress.com/2008/05/04/aims/
 API RECOMMENDED PRACTICE 584 Integrity Operating Windows FIRST EDITION, MAY 2014
 Pressure Equipment Integrity Incident Investigation API RECOMMENDED PRACTICE 585 FIRST EDITION, APRIL 2014
 Process Integrity in Engineering and Manufacturing [Kindle Edition] Jim Williams (Author) Published on Amazon.com

Further reading
  

Maintenance
Engineering